Karana is a genus of moths of the family Noctuidae.

Taxonomy
The genus Yula is treated as a valid genus or a synonym of Karana.

Species
 Karana argyrosemastis (Hampson, 1918)
 Karana argyrospila (Warren, 1912)
 Karana decorata Moore, 1882
 Karana gemmifera (Walker, [1858])
 Karana hoenei (Bang-Haas, 1927)
 Karana laetevirens (Oberthür, 1884)
 Karana metallica Boursin, 1970
 Karana moneta (Warren, 1912)
 Karana novaeguineae (Bethune-Baker, 1906)
 Karana submarginata (Warren, 1912)
 Karana tenuilinea (Warren, 1912)

References
Natural History Museum Lepidoptera genus database
Karana at funet

Hadeninae